Mesotrichoca is a genus of midges in the family Cecidomyiidae. The one described species in the genus - Mesotrichoca mesozoica - is known only from Siberia from a sediment fossil associated with the Late Jurassic and Lower Cretaceous epochs.  This species was placed in Catotricha when it was first described by Russian entomologist Vladimir Grigoryevich Kovalev. This genus was established by Mathias Jaschhof and Catrin Jaschhof in 2008.

References

Cecidomyiidae genera

Insects described in 2008
Taxa named by Mathias Jaschhof
Taxa named by Catrin Jaschhof
Monotypic Diptera genera
Prehistoric Diptera genera